Haribhau Madhav Jawale (1 June 1953 – 16 June 2020) was a politician from northern Maharashtra belonging to the Bharatiya Janata Party. He hailed from Jalgaon district in the Khandesh region of Maharashtra state.

Political career
Jawale was a member of the Maharashtra Vidhan Sabha from 1999-2004. He was elected to the 14th Lok Sabha in April, 2007 in a by-election from Jalgaon constituency in Maharashtra. He was re-elected to the 15th Lok Sabha from Raver constituency in Maharashtra. In March 2014, Jawale was re-nominated for 16th Lok Sabha from Raver constituency, but a week after BJP changed its nomination to Raksha Khadse. In October 2014, he contested the 2014 Maharashtra State Assembly election from Raver Vidhan Sabha constituency and defeated his nearest rival, Shirish Chaudhari of INC, by margin of 10,000 votes. Jawale got 65,962 votes, while Chaudhari got 55,962 votes.
Jawale lost the Raver Vidhan Sabha seat in 2019 to Shirish Chaudhari.
He has initiated most innovative projects in Agriculture: Banana products and Irrigation: Flood Canal Scheme: One of the largest under groundwater projects in Asia.

Death 
Jawale died of COVID-19 during the COVID-19 pandemic in India at the Bombay Hospital in Mumbai on 16 June 2020, fifteen days after his 67th birthday.

References

External links 
 Official biographical sketch in Parliament of India website
 http://www.whereincity.com/india/lok-sabha/members/haribhau-madhav-jawale.php
 http://mpa.nic.in/consult.htm

India MPs 2009–2014
India MPs 2004–2009
1953 births
2020 deaths
Marathi politicians
People from Jalgaon district
Lok Sabha members from Maharashtra
National Democratic Alliance candidates in the 2014 Indian general election
Maharashtra MLAs 1999–2004
Maharashtra MLAs 2014–2019
Bharatiya Janata Party politicians from Maharashtra
Deaths from the COVID-19 pandemic in India